The Pakistan Air Force Special Services Wing is a special operations force who specialised in all aspects of air-to-ground communication, including air traffic control, fire support, command, control and communications in covert counterterrorism or austere environments. Their functionality is similar to American Air Combat Control Team of the United States Air Force. They are often assigned individually or as a team to Army Special Service Group, Navy Special Service Group, Pakistan Rangers and special tactics units of the Pakistan Marines, to provide expert airfield seizure, airstrike control and communications capabilities.

History
After the 1965 war with India, Air Cdre Mukhtar Ahmad Dogar (SJ), who had flown Royal Indian Air Force aircraft supporting the Chindits Operating behind Japanese lines in Burma, was instrumental in creating a special forces unit for the Pakistan Air Force called SAW (Special Air Warfare Wing). The SAW was raised in 1966 under the command of Sqn Ldr Altaf Hussain Butt (GDP) as C.O of the unit. These Men were picked up directly from RTS (Recruit Training School) in January 1966. The unit was directly under the Directorate of Air Intl (DAI). In 1971, Upon request from PIA (Pakistan international Airline), members of SAW Unit were given to SKY MARSHALS to perform Flight Protection Services on all domestic and international flights till the end of 1973. When it was decided to convert the unit roll from Offensive to Defensive. 

In 1999, the concept of a special forces wing for the Air Force was again revived after the Kargil War with India. Senior officials and military scientists of the Pakistani Armed Forces were impressed in the way that United States Army Special Forces during the initial phase of the war in Afghanistan were able to secure targets, set up runways and airstrips for immediate use and direct strategic and tactical air strikes on enemy positions so quickly. The Air Force established the division under the name Special Service Wing (SSW). The training was undertaken by the Special Service Group (SSG) with new principles, doctrines and specialization from the United States. The close cooperation between the United States and Pakistani military since 2001 allowed many SSW soldiers to go to the United States to be trained on a regular basis. All of its members of SSW must have to be HALO/HAHO qualified with a skilled operations ability. The unit became operational in 2004. Recently, most of its members have completed or graduated with the members of 1st Special Operations Wing in the United States. The one of the combat brigade of Special Service Wing had been carrying out special day-light aerial and night-aerial operations during the recent insurgencies inside Pakistan. The one of the combat unit, alongside Navy's SSGN and Army's SSG, have actively participated in recent operations led by the Pakistan Army in Waziristan.

Training

All SSW members get their initial training from the Army's Special Operation School, Cherat. Soldiers wanting to join the SSW must have at least two years of service before they can join.

First, they are given basic training at Pakistan Air Force Ground Combat School Kallar Kahar for a 6–8 weeks. The initial course emphasizes tough physical conditioning and endurance. This includes a 40-mile march in 12 hours with 20 kg weight and a 5-mile run in 35 minutes with full gear (60-80 lbs) among the many physically demanding challenges. The concept of the initial training is designed to weed out the weak candidates. The drop out rate is very high; those who survive the initial training are then sent to Army Special Operation School for 9-12 Months for specialized training.

The advanced training includes anti-terrorist & hostage rescue, Minor Ops, basic desert, mountain, water, snow survival training, unarmed combat, firing with all types of weapons, intelligence, static line equipment jumps, diving etc. Many in the SSW are selected for additional specialist training. A HALO/HAHO course is given at Risalpur with a "Skydiver" tab awarded after 30 free fall jumps. For HAHO minimum 150 free fall jumps along with 10 night equipment free fall jumps are required. A "Mountain Warfare" qualification badge is given after completing a course at the Army Mountain Warfare School in Ratto; and a "Combat Diver" badge is awarded for the course held by the Special Service Group (Navy) at School of Divers PNS Hamalaya Karachi or by SSG(ARMY)'s MUSA company at Mangla .

SSW soldiers are occasionally sent to the United States for advanced training with the 1st Special Forces Group and the 75th Ranger Regiment in Fort Lewis, Fort Bragg and Fort Benning.

Capabilities

The SSW combat members are trained and qualified to carry out missions in unconventional warfare, special reconnaissance, direct action by sabotage and offensive raiding, Counter terrorism, counter-proliferation, VIP protection, and information and intelligence gathering operations. They have also carried out Combat search and rescue (CSAR), security assistance, humanitarian assistance.

They are also trained to be ground operators certified to act as air traffic controllers in hostile and dangerous environments. They can take over or construct an airstrip, set up navigational equipment, and direct airplanes and helicopters to a safe landing without the use of a tower or elaborate communications system. They also control air attacks of fixed- and rotary-wing aircraft from all military services.

They will also have the capability to perform search and rescue, typically of (but not limited to) downed pilots. They will be trained and able both to fight with virtually any special operations unit and to act as paramedics on the battlefield.

Some members of SSW will have the ability to gather and interpret meteorological and oceanographic information, as well as act as forward ground combatants. Their primary mission would be to collect and disseminate forward observations in denied, hostile, or otherwise data-sparse regions. But can be used for any kind of task as every member is trained for multiple tasks.

Organization
Special Services Wing has five squadrons and one separate Flight Wing.
Each Squadron consists of 250–400 men. Squadrons are divided into numerous flights which are further subdivided into 10-12 men teams. Squadrons are commanded by Wing Commanders/Squadron leaders.

Uniform

SSW (Special Services Wing) is distinguished by maroon berets with PAF Officer, JCO or Airmen berret insignia, and a wing on the right side of the chest. The combat uniform of the SSW is green jungle camouflage. They also wear their wing insignia.

Equipment
SSW is equipped with modern weaponry, including side arms such as SIG Sauer P226  and Glock pistols, H&K MP5 and FN P90 sub-machine guns, FN F2000 and Steyr AUG assault rifles. In the sniper or marksman role, the SSW teams are equipped with POF PSR-90 semi-automatic rifles and the Accuracy International Arctic Warfare bolt-action rifle. The general-purpose machine gun in use is the Rheinmetall/POF MG3, it is suspected that they may be also having FN Minimi LMG. They may also be equipped with anti-aircraft weapons and Unmanned aerial vehicles (UAV) for reconnaissance.

Operational experience
Since the formation of SSW in 2004, they have been engaged in fighting against militants in Pakistan's Khyber Pakhtunkhwa province and FATA region. SSW Also participated in repelling a Major Terrorist Attack over Pakistan Air Force Base Kamra alongside Army's SSG on the Night of 15/16 August 2012.

See also
 Special Service Group (Pakistan Army)
 Special Service Group (Navy) (Pakistan Navy)

References

External links
 Special Services Wing Training
 SSW Special Ops
 PAF sets up Commandos of SSG training center for Anti Terrorism operations

Military special forces of Pakistan
Pakistan Air Force wings
Airborne units and formations of Pakistan
Air force special forces units
Military units and formations established in 1965
Military units and formations disestablished in 1972
Military units and formations established in 2004